Brodie Paul Williams (born 18 March 1999) is a British swimmer.

Williams attended Millfield School. He competed in the 4×100 m medley relay event at the 2018 European Aquatics Championships, winning the gold medal.

Swam for Great Britain at the Tokyo Olympic games 2020 in both the 200M Backstroke and 400IM.

References

External links

1999 births
Living people
British male swimmers
British male backstroke swimmers
European Aquatics Championships medalists in swimming
Swimmers at the 2020 Summer Olympics
Swimmers at the 2022 Commonwealth Games
Commonwealth Games medallists in swimming
Commonwealth Games gold medallists for England
Commonwealth Games silver medallists for England
20th-century British people
21st-century British people
People educated at Millfield
Medallists at the 2022 Commonwealth Games